Luberizi is a town in the province of South Kivu of the Democratic Republic of Congo. At an elevation of 957 metres, it has a local population of about 25,462. It sits astride the N5 road where it crosses the Luberizi River, nearly midway between Uvira to the south and Bukavu to the north. The village of Mutarule, the scene of the 2014 South Kivu attack, is located outside the town.

References

Populated places in South Kivu